CeramTec manufactures and develops advanced ceramic components. The products are used in many different applications, especially in medical technologies, automotive manufacturing, electronics, equipment and machine construction, defense technologies, and chemical industries. The company headquarters are in Plochingen, Baden-Württemberg, Germany.

The company is present around the globe and has production sites and sales offices in the world’s most important markets. In Germany, the main sites are Plochingen, Lauf and Marktredwitz in addition to the company’s other German sites in Ebersbach, Lohmar, Wilhermsdorf and Wittlich.

The company is a member of the Ceramic Industry Association (German: Verband der Keramischen Industrie e.V.  - VKI).

History 

 The founding of CeramTec goes back to the year 1903, when the Thomas factories (Thomaswerke) were founded at the Marktredwitz site, and which were taken over by Philipp Rosenthal & Co. AG in 1908. In 1921 Philipp Rosenthal & Co. AG began cooperating with AEG in the development of technical porcelain for early industrial applications of ceramic materials. The two companies intensified this partnership in the area of technical ceramics in 1936, resulting in the foundation of Rosenthal Isolatoren GmbH, also known as RIG.

With the intention of manufacturing technical ceramics, they reorganized their cooperation in 1971. The result was the company Rosenthal Stemag Technische Keramik GmbH, which was renamed Rosenthal Technik AG in 1974. In 1985 Hoechst AG acquired the company and from that point on operated it under the name Hoechst CeramTec AG. Cerasiv GmbH, a company based in Plochingen, took over Hoechst CeramTec AG in 1996 and the newly formed company received the name CeramTec AG.

The site in Lauf an der Pegnitz has its roots in STEMAG AG (Steatit-Magnesia Aktiengesellschaft), founded in 1921. Following an initial incorporation into AEG in 1970, the company merged into Rosenthal Stemag Technische Keramik GmbH in 1971 as part of the reorganization of the partnership between Rosenthal and AEG.

Südplastik Gummi- und Kunststoffverarbeitung GmbH began operations at the Plochingen site in 1951. Feldmühle AG took over the company in 1953, renaming it Südplastik und -keramik GmbH (SPK). Feldmühle AG refocused its ceramic activities in 1991 in the newly founded Cerasiv GmbH, but then quickly sold it in 1992 to Metallgesellschaft AG, which integrated the company into its subsidiary Dynamit Nobel AG. Cerasiv GmbH’s acquisition of Hoechst CeramTec AG followed in 1996, resulting in the founding of CeramTec AG as a Metallgesellschaft AG (mg technologies AG) company.

Metallgesellschaft AG’s subgroup Dynamit Nobel AG broke away from Metallgesellschaft AG in 2004. KKR, an American private equity firm, became the main buyer, integrating parts of Dynamit Nobel AG into Rockwood Holdings Inc.  In the process, the US-based Rockwood group took over ownership of the CeramTec AG group. CeramTec continued to grow, acquiring and integrating Emil Müller GmbH (Wilhermsdorf, Germany) into the company as a subsidiary in 2007. A further acquisition followed in 2008; ETEC Gesellschaft für technische Keramik mbH also became a subsidiary and was renamed CeramTec-ETEC GmbH.

In 2013, Rockwood divested several of its companies and the CeramTec group was acquired by the British private equity firm Cinven.

In April 2017, CeramTec agreed to acquire the UK electro-ceramics business UK Electro-Ceramics, consisting of two manufacturing sites at Ruabon and Southampton, from Morgan Advanced Materials plc. In the same year, Cinven sold the company to private equity investor BC Partners for €2.6 billion. 

In spring 2021, CeramTec Group acquired the Swiss specialist for ceramic dental implants, Dentalpoint AG.

Applications and products 

 Applications range from ceramic components for artificial hip and knee replacements to dental ceramics, seal and regulator discs as well as cartridges in sanitary fittings, inserts for metalmachining, substrates for electronic circuits, appliance and mechanical components, fuse components, protection components, ceramics for ballistic protection of persons and vehicles, anti-wear components, dipping formers for surgical gloves, to piezoceramics as the key components of sensor and actuator technology products.

Material and product brands 

Alotec - Anti-wear and ballistic protection components
Alunit - Aluminium nitride ceramic for electronic substrates
Biolox - Ceramic Orthopedic Solutions
Ceramaseal - Vacuum-tight ceramic/metal components 
Ceramcool - Ceramic heat sinks for high-power LEDs and high-power electronics
Ceramdisc - Seal and regulator discs for sanitary fittings
Cyrol - Ceramic rolling elements based on silicon nitride ceramic
Densilox - Ceramic Dental Solutions
Rocar - Silicon carbide ceramics for industrial applications
Rubalit - Aluminium oxide ceramic for electronic substrates
SPK - Inserts for turning and milling cast components and toughened steels
Verilox - Ceramics for Animal Health

Main materials

Oxide ceramics 

Aluminium oxide
Zirconium oxide
Mixed / Dispersion Ceramics 
Aluminium titanate 
Silicate ceramic 
Piezoceramic

Non-oxide ceramics 

Silicon carbide (ROCAR, 3D-printing)
Silicon nitride 
Aluminum nitride (Alunit)
SiAIONs

Composite materials 

Metal Matrix Composite (MMC)

Salt cores 

Bonded
Sintered
Core shells

References

External links
 

Manufacturing companies of Germany